Vysokoye , rural localities in Russia, may refer to:

 Vysokoye, Arkhangelsk Oblast, a village
 Vysokoye, Mikhaylovsky District, Amur Oblast, a selo
 Vysokoye, Romnensky District, Amur Oblast, a selo
 Vysokoye, Belgorod Oblast, a selo
 Vysokoye, Belgorod Oblast, a selo
 Vysokoye, Bagrationovsky District, Kaliningrad Oblast, a settlement
 Vysokoye, Guryevsky District, Kaliningrad Oblast, a settlement
 Vysokoye, Krasnoznamensky District, Kaliningrad Oblast, a settlement
 Vysokoye, Nesterovsky District, Kaliningrad Oblast, a settlement
 Vysokoye, Slavsky District, Kaliningrad Oblast, a settlement
 Vysokoye, Kirov Oblast, a village
 Vysokoye, Kostroma Oblast, a village
 Vysokoye, Krasnodar Krai, a selo
 Vysokoye, Kostroma Oblast, a village
 Vysokoye, Glushkovsky District, Kursk Oblast, a selo
 Vysokoye, Medvensky District, Kursk Oblast, a selo
 Vysokoye, Mtsensky District, Oryol Oblast, a village
 Vysokoye, Orlovsky District, Oryol Oblast, a village
 Vysokoye, Pokrovsky District, Oryol Oblast, a village
 Vysokoye, Shablykinsky District, Oryol Oblast, a selo
 Vysokoye, Trosnyansky District, Oryol Oblast, a selo
 Vysokoye, Znamensky District, Oryol Oblast, a village
 Vysokoye, Penza Oblast, a selo
 Vysokoye, Primorsky Krai, a selo
 Vysokoye, Dedovichsky District, Pskov Oblast, a village
 Vysokoye, Nevelsky District, Pskov Oblast, a village
 Vysokoye, Novorzhevsky District, Pskov Oblast, a village
 Vysokoye, Opochetsky District, Pskov Oblast, a village
 Vysokoye, Strugo-Krasnensky, Pskov Oblast, a village
 Vysokoye, Pitelinsky District, Ryazan Oblast, a selo
 Vysokoye, Ryazansky District, Ryazan Oblast, a selo
 Vysokoye, Rybnovsky District, Ryazan Oblast, a village
 Vysokoye, Sarayevsky District, Ryazan Oblast, a selo
 Vysokoye, Skopinsky District, Ryazan Oblast, a selo
 Vysokoye, Shatsky District, Ryazan Oblast, a selo
 Vysokoye, Yermishinsky District, Ryazan Oblast, a village
 Vysokoye, Samara Oblast, a selo
 Vysokoye, Saratov Oblast, a selo
 Vysokoye, Sakhalin Oblast, a selo
 Vysokoye, Tomsk Oblast, a selo
 Vysokoye, Dubensky District, Tula Oblast, a village
 Vysokoye, Leninsky District, Tula Oblast, a selo
 Vysokoye, Odoyevsky District, Tula Oblast, a village
 Vysokoye, Venyovsky District, Tula Oblast, a village
 Vysokoye, Volovsky District, Tula Oblast, a village
 Vysokoye, Ust-Kubinsky District, Vologda Oblast, a settlement
 Vysokoye, Verkhovazhsky District, Vologda Oblast, a village
 Vysokoye, Liskinsky District, Voronezh Oblast, a selo
 Vysokoye, Vorobyovsky District, Voronezh Oblast, a settlement

See also
 Vysokaye (disambiguation)
 Vysoke (disambiguation)
 Vysoky (disambiguation)